Bampfylde or Bampfield is a surname, and may refer to:

 Augustus Bampfylde, 2nd Baron Poltimore
 Sir Charles Bampfylde, 5th Baronet
 Sir Coplestone Bampfylde, 2nd Baronet
 Sir Coplestone Bampfylde, 3rd Baronet
 Coplestone Warre Bampfylde
 George Bampfylde, 1st Baron Poltimore
 John Codrington Bampfylde
 John Bampfylde (1691—1750)
 Sir John Bampfylde, 1st Baronet
 Sir Richard Bampfylde, 4th Baronet
 Thomas Bampfield

Surnames
Surnames of British Isles origin
Surnames of English origin
English-language surnames